The 1929–30 season was Newport County's 10th season in the Football League. The club finished in 18th place and along the way recorded their biggest-ever Football League victory—a 10–0 defeat of near-neighbours Merthyr Town.

Season review

Results summary

Results by round

Fixtures and results

Third Division South

FA Cup

Welsh Cup

League table

Pld = Matches played; W = Matches won; D = Matches drawn; L = Matches lost; F = Goals for; A = Goals against;GA = Goal average; Pts = Points

External links
 Newport County 1929-1930 : Results
 Newport County football club match record: 1930
 Welsh Cup 1929/30

References

 Amber in the Blood: A History of Newport County. 

1929-30
English football clubs 1929–30 season
1929–30 in Welsh football